Keshav Prasad Mainali is a Nepalese politician. He currently belongs to Nepali Congress. He was the chairman of the Chure Bhawar Rastriya Ekta Party Nepal. He joined the Nepal Student Union in the late 1960s. He later became the president of the Nepali Congress Sarlahi District committee. He left the Nepali Congress, and founded the Chure Bhawar Ekta Samaj in 2006. This organization later became the Chure Bhawar Rastriya Ekta Party Nepal.

In the 2008 Constituent Assembly election, the party won 1 seat through the Proportional Representation vote. Mainali became the representative of the party in the assembly.

In 2010, Mainali was expelled from the Chure Bhawar Rastriya Ekta Party Nepal and he founded a new party, Chure Bhawar Rastriya Party.

References

Living people
Nepali Congress politicians from Madhesh Province
Chure Bhawar Rastriya Ekta Party Nepal politicians
Year of birth missing (living people)
Nepalese political party founders

Members of the 1st Nepalese Constituent Assembly